

History

The office of High Sheriff is over 1000 years old, with its establishment before the Norman Conquest. The Office of High Sheriff remained first in precedence in the counties until the reign of Edward VII when an Order in Council in 1908 gave the Lord-Lieutenant the prime office under the Crown as the Sovereign's personal representative. The High Sheriff remains the Sovereign's representative in the County for all matters relating to the Judiciary and the maintenance of law and order.

The office of High Sheriff for Radnorshire ceased with local government re-organisation in 1974, when it was combined with the High Sheriffs of Brecknockshire and Montgomeryshire as the High Sheriff of Powys.

List of officeholders

16th century

17th century

18th century

19th century

20th century

References

Sheriffs:Radnorshire - Powys Local History Encyclopaedia

 
Radnorshire
Radnorshire